Marzouk Mabrouk is a Libyan Olympic middle-distance runner. He represented his country in the men's 1500 meters at the 1980 Summer Olympics. His time was a 3:54.21.

References 

Living people
Libyan male middle-distance runners
Olympic athletes of Libya
Athletes (track and field) at the 1980 Summer Olympics
Year of birth missing (living people)